Parectypodus (meaning "besides Ectypodus") is an extinct genus of mammals that lived from Late Cretaceous (Maastrichtian) to Eocene time in North America. It is a member of the extinct order of Multituberculata, suborder Cimolodonta, family Neoplagiaulacidae. It was named by G.L. Jepsen in 1930.

Species
Parectypodus armstrongi (Johnston, P.A. & Fox, R.C., 1984). From the Puercan (Paleocene) Ravenscrag Formation, site Rav W-1, Saskatchewan, Canada. This specimen resides in the collection of the University of Alberta.
Parectypodus foxi (Storer, J.E., 1991). This Maastrichtian (Late Cretaceous)-age species from the Frenchman Formation of Saskatchewan is estimated to have weighed about 80 g.
Parectypodus laytoni (Jepsen, G.L., 1940; Sloan, R.E., 1966), also known as Ectypodus laytoni (Jepsen 1940). Remains are known from the Lower Tiffanian (Middle-Late Paleocene) Princeton Quarry, Wyoming (United States). This species has been cited as a descendant of P. sinclairi. It is a small species, having a weight of perhaps 10 g.
Parectypodus lunatus (Krause, D.W., 1982), also known as P. childei (Kühn, 1969). From the Wasatchian (Lower Eocene) Pocket Quarry of Colorado and Wyoming. This is a late species, having a weight of about 35 g.
Parectypodus simpsoni (Jepsen, G.L., 1930). Eocene.
Parectypodus sinclairi (Lamb, 1902; Clemens, 1964a). Known from the Puercan-Torrejonian (Paleocene) of Gidley Quarry, Montana, Wyoming, and Alberta, Canada. This species has been cited as having been derived from Mesodma formosa. It is a smaller species of about 15 g.
Parectypodus sloani (Schiebout, J.A., 1974). Fossils of this species have been found in the Torrejonian (Paleocene)-age beds of Big Bend, Texas.
Parectypodus sylviae (Rigby, J.K., 1980; Sloan, J.E., 1987) (=Ectypodus aphronorus (Sloan 1987), P. pattersoni (Sloan 1987)). Remains are known from the Torrejonian (Paleocene)-age Swain Quarry of Montana and Wyoming. The body weight of this species has been estimated as 15 g.
Parectypodus trovessartianus (Cope, E.D., 1882; Van Valen & Sloan, 1966). From the Puercan-Torrejonian (Paleocene) of the San Juan Basin, New Mexico. The body mass of this species has been estimated to have been around 90 g.
Parectypodus vanvaleni (Sloan, J.E. 1981). From the Puercan (Paleocene) of the San Juan Basin, New Mexico.

References 
 Jepsen, G.L. (1930), "New vertebrate fossils from the lower Eocene of the Bighorn Basin, Wyoming". Proc. Am. Philos. Soc. LXIX, p. 117-131.
 Jepsen, G.L. (1940), "Paleocene faunas of the Polecat Bench formation, Park County, Wyoming". Pro. Amer. Philos. Soc 83, p. 217-340, 21 figs., 5 pls.
 Johnston, P.A. and Fox, R.C. (1984), "Paleocene and Late Cretaceous mammals from Saskatchewan, Canada". Paleontogr. Abt. A: Paläozool., Stratigr 186', p. 163-222.
 Kielan-Jaworowska, Z. and Hurum, J.H. (2001), "Phylogeny and Systematics of multituberculate mammals". Paleontology 44, p. 389-429.
 Simpson (1935), "New Paleocene mammals from the Fort Union of Montana". Proc. US Nation. Museum 83, p. 221-244.
 Schiebout, J.A. (1974), "Vertebrate paleontology and paleoecology of Paleocene Black Peaks Formation, Big Bend National Park, Texas". Texas Memorial Museum Bull 24: 1-87.
 Storer, J.E. (1991). The mammals of the Gryde local fauna, Frenchman Formation (Maastrichtian: Lancian), Saskatchewan. Journal of Vertebrate Paleontology 11(3): 350–396.

Ptilodontoids
Paleocene mammals
Eocene mammals
Eocene genus extinctions
Extinct mammals of North America
Prehistoric mammal genera